Energy Company of Ukraine is a dissolved state-owned holding company for electricity assets  in Ukraine under Ministry of Fuel and Energy.  On 4 September 2014, the Government of Ukraine decided to dissolve the company. The process should be carried out within five months.

The company's computers (also) were inaccessible during the July 2017 cyberattacks on Ukraine; but electricity supply continued to operate without using computers.

Operations
Along with other state companies like Energoatom and Ukrenerho, Energy Company of Ukraine has produced electricity for Ukraine and abroad. Until 2010, the company had total installed power generation capacities of 29,6697 MW which corresponded to 56% of installed capacity of Ukrainian power stations.

Energy Company of Ukraine has operated thermal power stations through at least six regional subsidiaries such as Dniproenergo, Zakhidenergo, Centrenergo, Kyivenergo, Skhidenergo; and hydro power stations through Ukrhydroenergo; energy supplying companies also exist in each oblast such as Dniprooblenerho, Vinnytsiaoblenerho and others. A smaller state company "Ukrinterenergo", established in January 1993, operates only one plant named Kaluska CHP. Unlike most of Ukraine it is part of the IPS/UPS transmission grid, so Ukrinterenergo created a power generating island named "Burshtyn TES" that is synchronized with the ENTSO-E transmission grid. The island includes some companies of the Zakhidenergo.

Former subsidiaries
List of subsidiaries and percentage of ownership by Energy Company of Ukraine

Hydro-power generation
 Ukrhydroenergo - 100.0%
Kyiv Pumped Storage Power Station (Pumped-storage hydroelectricity)
 Kyiv HES (Hydro power plant)
 Kaniv HES
 Kaniv Pumped Storage Power Station
 Kremenchuk HES
 Middle Dnieper Hydroelectric Power Plant
 Dnieper HES
 Kakhovka HES
 Dniester HES
 Kyiv HAES
 Administration in construction of Dniester HAES
 Dniester Pumped Storage Power Station - 87.4%
 Dniester-2 HES

Thermal power generation

 Centrenergo - 78.3%
 Vuhlehirsk TES
 Zmiiv TES
 Trypillya TES
 Remenergo, maintenance company
 Zakhidenergo - 70.1%
 Burshtyn TES
 Dobrotvir TES
 Ladyzhyn TES
 Dniproenergo - 50.0%+1
 Transdnipro TES
 Kryvyi Rih TES
 Zaporizhia TES
 supporting companies
 Dniproenergoremont
 Dniproenergospecremont
 Dniproenergonaladka
 Dniproenergoavtotrans
 VOKhR
 Kyivenergo - 25%
 Thermal cogenerating power station 5
 Thermal cogenerating power station 6
 DTEK Skhidenergo - 0%
 Zuyiv TES
 Kurakhove TES
 Luhansk TES
 Donbasenergo - 25%+1 (Enerhoinvest Holding owns 60.77%)
 Starobeshiv TES
 Slovyansk TES
 Shteriv TES (former station redesigned into maintenance division of Donbasenerho)

Other thermal power generation
 Ukrhazovydobuvannia (Naftogaz Ukrainy)
 Lokachi TES

Power distribution
Some power distributing companies have capabilities of power generation such as Zakarpattiaoblenerho.
 Vinnytsiaoblenerho - 75.0%
 Volynoblenerho - 75.0%
 Zakarpattiaoblenerho - 75.0%
 Tereblya-Rikska HES
 Onokivska HES
 Uzhhorod HES
 Dniprooblenerho - 75.0%
 Khmelnytskoblenerho - 70.1%
 Krymenergo - 70.0%
 Mykolaivoblenergo - 70.0%
 Chernivtsioblenergo - 70.0%
 Donetskoblenergo - 65.1%
 Myronivsky TES
 Kharkivoblenergo - 65.0%
 Zaporizhiaoblenergo - 60.3%
 Luhanskoblenergo - 60.1%
 Ternopiloblenergo - 51.0%
 Cherkasyoblenergo - 46.0%

See also
 Energoatom
 Naftogaz Ukrainy
 List of power stations in Ukraine

References

External links
 
 Zanuda, A. ''Azarov posts power companies for sale (Азаров виставляє енергокомпанії на продаж). BBC Ukrainian. April 14, 2011.

Electric power companies of Ukraine
State companies based in Kyiv
Defunct energy companies of Ukraine